The Magdalena campaign was a military operation from late 1812 to early 1813 led by the independentists Simón Bolívar and Pierre Labatut against royalists and the crown of Spain in New Granada (present-day Colombia).  The campaign resulted in the revolutionary United Provinces of New Grenada taking control of the Magdalena River, which connects the port city of Cartagena with the interior of Colombia.

Background 
In April 1812 the First Republic of Venezuela collapsed under the assault of royalist forces led by the Spanish captain Domingo de Monteverde, leading to the reestablishment of the Captaincy General of Venezuela. As a result, many members of the independence movement, including Simón Bolívar, fled to Cartagena from Venezuela.

Cartagena had declared independence on 11 November 1811, becoming the first revolutionary bastion of the region. The neighboring city Santa Marta had flirted with independence with the creation of the Junta Superior Provincial de Santa Marta on 10 August 1810 but it was deposed only 5 months later on 22 December.  Thus began a protracted period of war between the royalists of Santa Marta and the republicans of Cartagena.

In September 1812 several royalist insurrections broke out within Cartagena Province carried out by indigenous communities in Corozal and Tolú, fomented by local priests and exacerbated by Cartagena's constant demands for supplies on the surrounding countryside. The royalists took advantage of social resentment of indigenous people against creoles and mestizos. The indigenous population was generally opposed to a liberal revolution that represented the possible abolition of their rights and the loss of the cooperative spirit of the old regime. The royalists were thus able to block traffic on the Magdalena River, a significant blow to Cartagena as the city depended on the river to receive supplies from the interior. The city was left isolated and surrounded by royalist troops in Ayapel and Panama to the east and Santa Marta to the west, all of which were receiving a steady stream of supplies from Cuba.

Looking for support to mount a campaign to recapture Venezuela, Bolívar and other exiles published the Cartagena Manifesto on 15 December 1812, a political and military analysis of the causes of the downfall of the First Republic of Venezuela.  The manifesto also exhorted the United Provinces of New Granada to not commit the same errors as Venezuela such as embracing federalism, religious fanaticism, or engaging in political in-fighting.

Campaign 
Soon after his arrival in Cartagena Bolívar requested a commission in the city's army but he was only given command of a garrison of 70 men in the small town of Barrancas. Bolívar was initially placed under the command of the French adventurer Pierre Labatut.  The royalists from Santa Marta prepared to march against Cartagena by assembling a force of one thousand five hundred soldiers on the banks of the Magdalena River; their first target was Mompox whose residents fought back.  Nevertheless, the royalists prevailed, taking Momox along with Guamal, Valledupar and Riohacha. In the meantime many of the republican exiles from Venezuela joined up with the Spanish colonel Manuel Cortés de Campomanes, who advanced down the Magdalena with a force of six hundred men, but were ambushed by royalist militias under the command of Aguardole Rebustillo at the confluence of the Mancomaján River.  Two days later they clashed again in the village of Oveja. Both battles were won by the republicans. Rebustillo escaped back to Santa Marta while Cortés de Campomanes turned his attention to putting down the royalist insurrections in the surrounding towns.

Against Labatut's orders, Bolívar decided to take the initiative by attacking the royalists occupying villages along the banks of the Magdalena while they collected supplies and reinforcements.  He successfully dislodged the royalists from Tenerife, Guamal, El Blanco, Mompós, Tamalameque and the port of Ocaña; and defeated various realist militias operating in the area and finally took the city of Ocaña on 10 January 1813. The fighting in Bolivar's part of the campaign was relatively light with low casualties.

Labatut started his own campaign with 200 republican militia from Barranquilla and a flotilla of small boats. In early November they took the forts at Sitio Nuevo, El Palmar and Sitio Viejo; confiscating 16 canons and 4 armed launches. Labatut next attacked Gúaimaro on 18 November with 340 soldiers, capturing a large quantity of artillery and munitions and several armed boats.  The Frenchman stayed to take control of the local government and root out the remaining royalists who had taken refuge in the San Antonio hills. The lower Magdalena was henceforth under the control of the republicans  until the Spanish reconquest of New Granada in 1815.

Aftermath
Following the success of the Magdalena campaign, Bolívar focused on organizing what would become the Campaña Admirable to retake Venezuela.  He left his troops under the command of Manuel del Castillo y Rada.

See also 
 Campaña Admirable

References

Notes

Bibliography 
 Bermúdez Bermúdez, Arturo E. (1997). Materiales para la historia de Santa Marta: recopilación histórica. Santa Marta: Universidad del Magdalena, Fondo Editorial.
 Conde Calderón, Jorge (1999). Espacio, sociedad y conflictos en la provincia de Cartagena, 1740–1815. Barranquilla: Universidad del Atlántico. 
 Gutiérrez Ramos, Jairo. "Los indígenas en la Independencia". Revista Credencial Historia. No. 247, Bogotá. Julio de 2010. 
 Henao, Jesús María & Gerardo Arrubla (1920). Historia de Colombia para la enseñanza secundaria. Tomo II. Bogotá: Camacho Roldán & Tamayo. 
 Payares González, Carlos (2009) [2004]. Santa Marta y Ciénaga durante la Independencia: La batalla del resguardo de San Juan Bautista de la Ciénaga. Texto presentado en el Congreso 2010 del Centro de Estudios de Historia de América Latina de la Pontificia Universidad Católica de São Paulo (PUC-PS). Recopilado en El Salto de la Liebre, libro del 2013. 
 Pérez O., Eduardo (1982). La guerra irregular en la independencia de la Nueva Granada y Venezuela 1810–1830. Tunja: Ediciones "La Rana y el Águila". 
 Plaza, José Antonio de (1850). Compendio de la historia de la Nueva Granada: Desde antes de su descubrimiento hasta el 17 de noviembre de 1831. Bogotá: Imprenta de León Echeberría. 
 Restrepo, José Manuel (1858). Historia de la Revolución de la República de Colombia en la América Meridional. Tomo I. Besazon: Imprenta de José Jacquin. 
 Restrepo, José Manuel (2009) [1827]. Historia de la Revolución de la República de Colombia en la América Meridional. Tomo I. Medellín: Universidad de Antioquia. Edición de Leticia Bernal Villegas. 
 Valencia Tovar, Álvaro & José Manuel Villalobos Barradas (1993). Historia de las fuerzas militares de Colombia. Ejército. Tomo I. Bogotá: Planeta. . 
 Viloria de la Hoz, Joaquín (2011). “Las primeras luchas por la Independencia en la provincia de Santa Marta, 1810–1815”. Expedición Padilla. 
 Viloria de la Hoz, Joaquín (2002). Empresas y empresarios de Santa Marta durante el siglo XIX: el caso de la familia de Mier. Bogotá: Publicaciones de la Facultad de Administración, Universidad de los Andes.

Colonial Colombia
Independence of Colombia
Simón Bolívar
Conflicts in 1812
Conflicts in 1813
Wars involving Colombia
Wars involving Spain
Military history of Colombia
Spanish American wars of independence
1812 in Colombia
1813 in Colombia
1812 in the Viceroyalty of New Granada
1813 in the Viceroyalty of New Granada